Lithocarpus clementianus is a tree in the beech family Fagaceae. It is named for Governor Cecil Clementi Smith of the Straits Settlements (former British territories in Malaya).

Description
The brownish bark is fissured or cracked.

Distribution and habitat
Lithocarpus clementianus grows naturally in southern Thailand, Peninsular Malaysia and Borneo. Its habitat is hill dipterocarp to lower montane forests up to  altitude.

References

clementianus
Trees of Thailand
Trees of Peninsular Malaysia
Trees of Borneo
Plants described in 1888